Mustafa Koç may refer to:

 Mustafa Koç (volleyball), Turkish volleyball player
 Mustafa Vehbi Koç, a member of the Koç family, a Turkish family of business people